Łąkie may refer to:

Łąkie, Grodzisk Wielkopolski County in Greater Poland Voivodeship (west-central Poland)
Łąkie, Lipno County in Kuyavian-Pomeranian Voivodeship (north-central Poland)
Łąkie, Mogilno County in Kuyavian-Pomeranian Voivodeship (north-central Poland)
Łąkie, Złotów County in Greater Poland Voivodeship (west-central Poland)
Łąkie, Gmina Lipnica in Pomeranian Voivodeship (north Poland)
Łąkie, Lubusz Voivodeship (west Poland)
Łąkie, Gdańsk County in Pomeranian Voivodeship (north Poland)
Łąkie, West Pomeranian Voivodeship (north-west Poland)